The Olav Thon Foundation is a Norwegian foundation and as such the biggest in Norway.

Information 
In accordance with its statutes, the Olav Thon Foundation's primary activity is to own the Olav Thon Group, including the hotel chain Thon Hotels. This makes the foundation a sizable business sector participant and one of the country's bigger real estate owners. The foundation's capital is approximately 25,4 billion crowns, of which 15 billions are so-called unattackable.

Additionally, the Olav Thon Foundation gives annual economic support to scientific projects within mathematics, natural science, and medicine. This includes up to ten annual prizes of 500,000 crowns each, given to Norwegian or foreign scientists, and an annual international prize of five million crowns.

The Olav Thon Foundation was established on 10 December 2013 in Oslo by Olav Thon.

See also 
 Olav Thon
 Olav Thon Group
 Foundations in Norway

References 

Foundations based in Norway
Norwegian billionaires